Lamprosema haesitans is a moth in the family Crambidae. It was described by Edward Meyrick in 1934. It is found in the Democratic Republic of the Congo (Orientale, Equateur).

References

Moths described in 1934
Lamprosema
Moths of Africa